Vanguard SLV-5, also called Vanguard Satellite Launch Vehicle-Five hoped to be the third successful flight of the American Vanguard rocket following the successful Vanguard 2 satellite on rocket Vanguard SLV-4.

Background 
Launched in April 1959, the mission failed when the second stage failed to operate following first-stage separation. The satellites and third stage tumbled into the Atlantic Ocean several hundred kilometers off the coast after about 500 seconds of flight.

Launch vehicle 

Vanguard was the designation used for both the launch vehicle and the satellite. It also held  of hydrogen peroxide.

This stage contained the complete guidance and control system.

The thin  steel casing for the third stage had a hemispherical forward dome with a shaft at the center to support the satellite and an aft dome fairing into a steel exit nozzle.

This was the same launch vehicle configuration, with minor modifications, as used for Vanguard TV-3 and all succeeding Vanguard flights up to and including Vanguard SLV-6.

Spacecraft

Magnetic Field Satellite 
The primary objective of the Magnetic Field Satellite (Sphere A) was to determine the source of magnetic storms - to determine if they occur due to electric currents in the ionosphere or from currents at much greater distances. A secondary objective was to obtain data on the daily cycle of magnetic field variations, thus providing a highly accurate map of the Earth's main magnetic field in certain regions of space.

Four  spring-actuated antennas were mounted to the satellites equator, equally spaced. The interior of the satellite held a cylindrical magnesium container with two pressure-tight compartments. The lower compartment held the batteries, and the upper compartment held the magnetometer electronics, an 80 milliwatt telemetry transmitter operating at 108.3 MHz, a 10 milliwatt Minitrack beacon transmitter at 108.00 MHz, and a command receiver. The magnetometer was a proton precessional magnetometer. The magnetometer sensing unit was mounted in the outer end of the fiberglass boom. The design of the satellite required non-magnetic materials, including special batteries.

Sub-Satellite 
The Sub-Satellite (Sphere B) objective was to provide data on air density in the outer limits of the atmosphere of Earth. A later version of the Magnetic Field Satellite was successfully launched as Vanguard 3 (1959 Eta 1).

On separation of the Magnetic Field Satellite, a preset latch would release the gas into the Sub-Satellite, inflating it and pushing it free of the spent third stage. Upon inflation, the Sub-Satellite would be a 76.2 cm (30 inch) diameter aluminum-coated mylar balloon. It contained no instrumentation and was designed to be optically tracked from Earth to provide data on the density of the upper atmosphere by measuring its effect on the satellite orbit.

Launch 
Vanguard SLV-5 launched on 14 April 1959 at 02:49:46 GMT (09:49:46 p.m. EST, 13 April 1959), from Launch Complex 18A (LC-18A) at the Cape Canaveral Air Force Station (CCAFS). At separation of the first stage 142.0 seconds after launch, caused the second stage engine to ignite while still attached to the first stage. Pressure from the engine exhaust pushed the thrust chamber to the limit of the gimbal stops, breaking them and causing loss of attitude control in flight. The pitch-attitude control of the second stage was lost due to large side forces acting on the second stage exhaust nozzle caused by back pressure built up in the interstage compartment. The third stage and satellites were thrown from the tumbling second stage. The second stage tumbled and the resultant forces caused a premature separation of the third stage and payload. Data was received from them until impact into the Atlantic Ocean eight minutes after liftoff.

See also 

 Vanguard rocket
 Project Vanguard
 Comparison of orbital launch systems
 Comparison of orbital rocket engines
 Rocket
 Spacecraft propulsion

References

Further reading 
 Mallove, Eugene F. and Matloff, Gregory L. The Starflight Handbook: A Pioneer's Guide to Interstellar Travel, Wiley, 

Spacecraft launched in 1959
Project Vanguard
Satellite launch failures
Space accidents and incidents in the United States